Live Wires is a 1921 American silent drama film directed by Edward Sedgwick and starring Johnnie Walker, Edna Murphy and Alberta Lee.

Cast
 Johnnie Walker as Bob Harding
 Edna Murphy as 	Rena Austin
 Alberta Lee as 	Mrs. Harding
 Frank Clark as 	James Harding
 Robert Klein as 	Slade
 Hayward Mack as 	James Flannery
 Wilbur Higby as 	Austin 
 Lefty James as The Coach

References

Bibliography
 Connelly, Robert B. The Silents: Silent Feature Films, 1910-36, Volume 40, Issue 2. December Press, 1998.
 Munden, Kenneth White. The American Film Institute Catalog of Motion Pictures Produced in the United States, Part 1. University of California Press, 1997.
 Solomon, Aubrey. The Fox Film Corporation, 1915-1935: A History and Filmography. McFarland, 2011.

External links
 

1921 films
1921 drama films
1920s English-language films
American silent feature films
Silent American drama films
American black-and-white films
Fox Film films
Films directed by Edward Sedgwick
1920s American films